Tank is a tehsil located in Tank District, Khyber Pakhtunkhwa, Pakistan.

Geography
Tank Tehsil has an area of 1,679 km2.

Adjacent tehsils
Frontier Region Tank, Federally Administered Tribal Areas (north)
Lakki Marwat Tehsil, Lakki Marwat District (northeast)
Kulachi Tehsil, Dera Ismail Khan District (south)
Wana Tehsil, South Waziristan Agency, Federally Administered Tribal Areas (southwest)
Sararogha Tehsil, South Waziristan Agency, Federally Administered Tribal Areas (northwest)

Demographics

Tank Tehsil has a population of 391,885 and has 43,071 households according to the 2017 census. The population recorded in the 1998 census was 238,216.

See also 
 List of tehsils of Khyber Pakhtunkhwa

References 

Tehsils of Khyber Pakhtunkhwa
Populated places in Tank District